Zimelidine (INN, BAN) (brand names Zimeldine, Normud, Zelmid) was one of the first selective serotonin reuptake inhibitor (SSRI) antidepressants to be marketed. It is a pyridylallylamine, and is structurally different from other antidepressants.

Zimelidine was developed in the late 1970s and early 1980s by Arvid Carlsson, who was then working for the Swedish company Astra AB. It was discovered following a search for drugs with structures similar to brompheniramine (it is a derivative of brompheniramine), an antihistamine with antidepressant activity. Zimelidine was first sold in 1982.

While zimelidine had a very favorable safety profile, within a year and a half of its introduction, rare case reports of  Guillain–Barré syndrome emerged that appeared to be caused by the drug, prompting its manufacturer to withdraw it from the market. After its withdrawal, it was succeeded by fluvoxamine and fluoxetine (derived from the antihistamine diphenhydramine) in that order, and the other SSRIs.

Mechanism of action
The mode of action is a strong reuptake inhibition of serotonin from the synaptic cleft. Postsynaptic receptors are not acted upon.

Other uses
Zimelidine was reported by Montplaisir and Godbout to be very effective for cataplexy in 1986, back when this was usually controlled by tricyclic antidepressants, which often had anticholinergic effects. Zimelidine was able to improve cataplexy without causing daytime sleepiness.

Side effects
Most often reported were:

 Dry mouth, dryness of pharyngeal and nasal membranes
 Increased sweating (hyperhidrosis)
 Vertigo
 Nausea

Interactions 

 MAO inhibitors — severe or life-threatening reactions possible

See also 
Ranitidine
RTI-353
Triprolidine
SB-649,915

References 

Alkene derivatives
Dimethylamino compounds
Antidepressants
AstraZeneca brands
Hepatotoxins
Bromoarenes
3-Pyridyl compounds
Selective serotonin reuptake inhibitors
Withdrawn drugs